Thomas F. Sweeney (May 10, 1933 – February 5, 2007) was an American politician.

Sweeney was a native of Norwich, Connecticut, born on May 10, 1933, to parents to Thomas P. Sweeney and Jane P. Toomey Sweeney. He served in the United States Marine Corps during the Korean War. He was a Democratic Party-affiliated member of the Connecticut House of Representatives from the 46th district, encompassing his hometown, for eighteen years, until his 1984 electoral defeat by Peter Nystrom. Sweeney also worked for the state's Department of Labor Mediation and Arbitration. He died on February 5, 2007.

References

1933 births
2007 deaths
Democratic Party members of the Connecticut House of Representatives
20th-century American politicians
United States Marine Corps personnel of the Korean War
Politicians from Norwich, Connecticut